William Collins, Sons (often referred to as Collins) was a Scottish printing and publishing company founded by a Presbyterian schoolmaster, William Collins, in Glasgow in 1819, in partnership with Charles Chalmers, the younger brother of Thomas Chalmers, minister of Tron Church, Glasgow.

Collins merged with Harper & Row in 1990, forming a new publisher named HarperCollins.

History
The company had to overcome many early obstacles, and Charles Chalmers left the business in 1825. The company eventually found success in 1841 as a printer of Bibles, and, in 1848, Collins's son Sir William Collins developed the firm as a publishing venture, specialising in religious and educational books. The company was renamed William Collins, Sons and Co Ltd. in 1868. (The Library of Congress reports W. Collins & Co., or William Collins & Company, Collins & Co., etc., before "sometime in the 1860s", then "William Collins Sons and Co.")

Although the early emphasis of the company had been on religion and education, Collins also published more widely. In 1917, with Sir Godfrey Collins in charge, the firm started publishing fiction. Collins Crime Club (1930–94) published all but the first six of Agatha Christie's novels, starting in 1926, as well as the British editions of Rex Stout's Nero Wolfe books and many others from the Golden Age of Detective Fiction. Upon purchasing the rights to the works of C. S. Lewis, Fount was established as Collins's religion imprint.

Collins ultimately became a diverse and prolific company, publishing a wide range of titles, including many aimed at a juvenile audience, such as the books of Dr. Seuss (in the Commonwealth) and Racey Helps in the 1950s. By the late 1970s, Collins was also responsible for publishing the long-running American Children's Hardy Boys and Nancy Drew series in the United Kingdom. These were firstly published in a series of digest size hardbacks akin to their American style. Paperbacks (of a 'normal' rather than 'digest' size) soon followed from Collins' Armada Books imprint, although the series as published in Great Britain follow a different numbering system to the accepted American one. Collins's Armada Books imprint also published similar series, such as the Three Investigators, alongside such British stalwarts as Biggles, Billy Bunter, and Paddington Bear, and such well-loved authors as Enid Blyton, Malcolm Saville and Diana Pullein-Thompson.

In the years 1941-49 Collins published Britain in Pictures, a series of social history books which were designed to boost morale during the Second World War. Authors included George Orwell, John Piper, Neville Cardus, Cecil Beaton, Vita Sackville-West, David Low, Francis Meynell, Edith Sitwell, Graham Greene and John Betjeman.

Collins founded its New Naturalist series of nature books relevant to the British Isles in 1945, with Butterflies by E. B. Ford. Three volumes appeared in the summer of 2015.

In 1953, Collins launched its Fontana Books series. Later Fontana Books became a Collins imprint complete with its own series, including the Fontana Monarchs, the Fontana African Fiction series and, from 1970, the Fontana Modern Masters, a series of pocket guides to influential writers, philosophers and other thinkers and theorists of the twentieth century. Other William Collins, Sons, imprints included Fontana Lions and Fontana Young Lions, which published books for children and teenagers, and Grafton Books.

In 1965 Collins began publication of The Companion Guides, a series of illustrated travel guides to France, the Mediterranean lands and the British Isles.

In the mid 1970s, Collins had either closed or moved most of its printing operations out of its historic site in the Townhead area of Glasgow.  The land and buildings were purchased by the University of Strathclyde who redeveloped much of the site, with the massive warehouse building on Cathedral Street being converted into a new home for the Andersonian Library in 1980.

News Corporation acquired a 40% stake in 1981. In 1983, Collins acquired the publishing operations of Granada. News Corporation became sole owner in 1989. In 1990, the company was merged with US publisher Harper & Row to form HarperCollins. Collins became an imprint of HarperCollins.

On 8 February 2013 it was announced that some parts of the Collins non-fiction imprint would be merged with the HarperPress imprint to form a new William Collins imprint.

Collins Education
Collins Education, an imprint of HarperCollins Publishers, is the third-largest educational publishing house in the United Kingdom.

It publishes print and interactive digital products for primary and secondary teachers in the United Kingdom and internationally.

In 2010, Collins Education acquired Belair Creative, a British publisher specialising in art and design resources for British primary students; Letts and Lonsdale, a major UK publisher of revision guides; and Leckie & Leckie, a Scottish educational publisher.

In 2011, Collins Education launched Collins Online Learning, an online learning platform for students and teachers.

References

Further reading
 Thomas Burke, English Inns - example of Britain in Pictures series
 Michaael Carney, Britain in Pictures: A History and Bibliography, Werner Shaw, 1995.

External links

 

 
Book publishing companies of Scotland
Publishing companies established in 1819
1819 establishments in Scotland
Publishing companies disestablished in 1990

News Corporation subsidiaries